Pele Peletelese (born 22 October 1984) is a New Zealand former professional rugby league footballer who played as a  for the Parramatta Eels in the NRL in 2010.

Playing career
Peletelese played for the Burleigh Bears in the Queensland Cup in 2007 and 2008 before signing with Parramatta Eels in 2009 season. He made his lone first grade appearance from the bench in his sides' 35−6 loss to the New Zealand Warriors at Mount Smart Stadium in round 17 of the 2010 season. He was released by the club at the end of the 2012 season and subsequently retired from playing rugby league.

References

1984 births
Living people
Burleigh Bears players
New Zealand rugby league players
Parramatta Eels players
Rugby league props
Rugby league players from Auckland